Tianyuan may refer to:

Tianyuan (Go) (天元), centre of a Go board or a Go competition in China
Tianyuan District (天元区), Zhuzhou, Hunan
Tianyuan, Cixi (天元镇), town in Cixi City, Zhejiang
Tianyuan Cave (田园洞), cave near Beijing where the Tianyuan man was found
Tianyuan man (田园洞人), one of the earliest modern humans to inhabit eastern Asia
Tian yuan shu (天元術), a Chinese system of algebra for polynomial equations created in the 13th century

Historical eras
Tianyuan (天元, 1379–1388), era name used by Uskhal Khan Tögüs Temür, emperor of Northern Yuan
Tianyuan (添元, 1453–1457), era name used by Esen Taishi, ruler of Northern Yuan

See also
Tian Yuan (disambiguation)